Goemon may refer to:

 Ishikawa Goemon (1558–1594), legendary ninja warrior and bandit hero
 Goemon Ishikawa XIII, his fictional descendant, created by Monkey Punch for his manga series Lupin III
 Goemon (film), a 2009 film by Kazuaki Kiriya
 Ganbare Goemon, the video game series
Koji Nakagawa, a Japanese wrestler who previously wrestled as Goemon